Total TV is a satellite television provider co-owned by Serbian Serbia Broadband and United Group. It broadcasts via Eutelsat 16A satellite (16.0E) and has over 1 million subscribers in Southeast Europe, namely Bosnia and Herzegovina, Montenegro, North Macedonia, Serbia and Slovenia.

The Croatian stake was sold to new owners of V-Investment Holdings B.V; despite the change in ownership the name of the service has remained the same. They are direct competitors to MAXtv of Hrvatski Telekom and A1.

References

External links
 Total TV

Mass media companies established in 2006
Mass media companies of Serbia
Companies based in Belgrade
Direct broadcast satellite services
Serbian companies established in 2006